Aircraft produced by China.

Military aircraft designation system
As a convention, the designations of Chinese military aircraft usually start from 5 instead of 1.

Bombers

Fighter aircraft

Ground attack aircraft

Airborne early warning and control

Trainers

Military utility aircraft (transport/tanker/passenger)

Military UAV 
For the reason that Chinese UAV developers / manufacturers have officially released a considerable number of military UAVs, and also due to Chinese government's transparency policy for military UAV, this sub-list will only focus on models that are already identified and introduced into the PLA.

Helicopters

Civilian transport and passenger aircraft

Agricultural aircraft

Airships

Electric aircraft

Gliders and sailplanes

See also
 Aviation Industry Corporation of China
 China Aviation Industry Corporation I
 China Aviation Industry Corporation II
 List of Chinese aircraft engines
 List of unmanned aerial vehicles of China
 People's Liberation Army Air Force

References

China

Aircraft
Aircraft